Echu Tirmcharna mac Fergusso (died ca. 556) was a king of Connacht from the Uí Briúin branch of the Connachta. Genealogically he is mentioned as the great-great grandson of  Dauí Tenga Uma (d. 500) a previous king. Prof. Byrne believes that the early Uí Briúin genealogies are fabricated however. His place in the king lists falls between the reign of Ailill Inbanda (d. 549) and of his son Áed mac Echach Tirmcharna (d. 575). The Annals of Tigernach simply mention him as king in 556 and his son's accession to the throne in 557.

A Poem on the Kings of Connaught describes him as Echu "dryflesh", the "choice man", and also as noble.

Notes

See also
Kings of Connacht

References

Annals of Tigernach
T.M. Charles-Edwards, Early Christian Ireland
Francis J. Byrne, Irish Kings and High-Kings
Book of Leinster, Section 30
The Chronology of the Irish Annals, Daniel P. McCarthy

External links
CELT: Corpus of Electronic Texts at University College Cork

550s deaths
Kings of Connacht
People from County Roscommon
6th-century Irish monarchs
Year of birth unknown
Year of death uncertain